Federico Martorell Rigo (born 16 March 1981) is an Argentine retired footballer who played as centre back in Argentina.

Club career
His professional debut came in 2002 with Newell's Old Boys in Santa Fe.

Greek Super League
Martorell started his career in Greece playing for Thrasyvoulos. In Fyli Federico had 14 caps and scored 3 goal.

As a result of his good performance Levadeiakos offered a contract to Federico. In Livadia he had also 14 caps.

Cyprus
After 2 years in Super League Federico moved to Apollon Limassol on a free transfer. He made his debut on a 1–0 defeat against FC Sibir Novosibirsk for the Europa League. Later, he was given on loan to Ermis Aradippou. In May 2011, he was released from Apollon.

Venezuela
He signed a contract with Deportivo Táchira for the 2012 season.

Honours

Club
Cobresal
 Primera División de Chile (1): 2015 Clausura

External links
Federico Martorell at BDFA.com.ar 

1981 births
Living people
Footballers from Rosario, Santa Fe
Argentine footballers
Argentine expatriate footballers
Newell's Old Boys footballers
Atlético Tucumán footballers
Club Atlético Platense footballers
Universidad de Chile footballers
Coronel Bolognesi footballers
Thrasyvoulos F.C. players
Instituto footballers
Cobresal footballers
O'Higgins F.C. footballers
Deportivo Táchira F.C. players
Apollon Limassol FC players
Ermis Aradippou FC players
Levadiakos F.C. players
Sportivo Belgrano footballers
San Luis de Quillota footballers
Club y Biblioteca Ramón Santamarina footballers
Chilean Primera División players
Argentine Primera División players
Super League Greece players
Cypriot First Division players
Expatriate footballers in Chile
Expatriate footballers in Greece
Expatriate footballers in Peru
Expatriate footballers in Cyprus
Expatriate footballers in Venezuela
Argentine expatriate sportspeople in Greece
Association football defenders